Philipp Meitner (24 August 1839, Vienna – 9 December 1910, Vienna) was an Austrian lawyer and chess master. His most famous game was the "Immortal Draw" (Carl Hamppe vs Philipp Meitner, Vienna 1872). He won at Vienna 1875, and won a match against Adolf Schwarz (6½–3½) at Vienna 1878.

Meitner played in two strong international tournaments in the Vienna 1873 and Vienna 1882. He tied for 7–8th in the first tournament (Wilhelm Steinitz and Joseph Henry Blackburne won), and took 14th in the second one (Wilhelm Steinitz and Szymon Winawer won). He also tied for 8–9th at Vienna 1882 (Vincenz Hruby won), took 8th at Vienna 1895 (Georg Marco won), took 4th at Vienna 1908 (Richard Réti won), and tied for 6–7th at Vienna 1909/1910 (Trebitsch Memorial, Réti won).

Meitner studied at the Vienna Polytecnic, and William Steinitz was a fellow student.

Philipp Meitner was the father of Dr. Lise Meitner.

See also 
 List of chess games

References

External links 
 Chess games of Philipp Meitner

1838 births
1910 deaths
Austrian chess players
Austrian Jews
Jewish chess players
TU Wien alumni
19th-century chess players
Game players from Vienna